Vagaceratops (meaning "wandering (vagus, Latin) horned face", in reference to its close relationship with Kosmoceratops from Utah) is a genus of herbivorous ceratopsian dinosaur. It is a chasmosaurine ceratopsian which lived during the Late Cretaceous period (late Campanian) in what is now Alberta. Its fossils have been recovered from the Upper Dinosaur Park Formation. It is sometimes included in the genus Chasmosaurus as Chasmosaurus irvinensis instead of being recognized as its own genus.

Description

Vagaceratops was a medium-sized ceratopsian, reaching  in length and weighing . It is known primarily from three fossil skulls. Although the general structure was typical of ceratopsids (i.e. a parrot-like beak, large neck frill, and nasal horn) it has some peculiarities. The skulls are characterized by a reduced supraorbital horn, brow horns that are reduced to low bosses and a larger snout compared to related animals. Vagaceratops had smaller parietal fenestrae than most ceratopsids and had a strange configuration of epoccipitals (bones surrounding the frill). It possessed ten epoccipitals, eight of which were centrally flattened, curved forward and upward and fused together to form a jagged margin along the back of the frill. The frill was shorter and more square-shaped than other chasmosaurines, being wider than it was long.

Classification

Vagaceratops was named by Scott D. Sampson, Mark A. Loewen, Andrew A. Farke, Eric M. Roberts, Catherine A. Forster, Joshua A. Smith, and Alan L. Titus in 2010, and the type species is Vagaceratops irvinensis.  This species was originally described as a species of Chasmosaurus (C. irvinensis) in 2001. Its relationships remain debated. Vagaceratops has variously been allied with Kosmoceratops or with Chasmosaurus.

The cladogram below is the phylogeny of the Chasmosaurinae by Brown et al. (2015):

Recently it has been suggested that Chasmosaurinae had a deep evolutionary split between a Chasmosaurus clade and a Pentaceratops clade. Vagaceratops was hypothesized to be the last member of the Chasmosaurus clade from northern Laramidia, with the last representative of the clade being its close relative Kosmoceratops.

See also

 Timeline of ceratopsian research

References

External links

Vagaceratops irvinensis at the Canadian Museum of Nature

Chasmosaurines
Late Cretaceous dinosaurs of North America
Fossil taxa described in 2010
Taxa named by Scott D. Sampson
Taxa named by Catherine Forster
Dinosaur Park fauna
Paleontology in Utah
Campanian genus first appearances
Campanian genus extinctions
Ornithischian genera